Élisabeth Lamure (born 20 November 1947) is a French politician and a member of the Senate of France. She represents the Rhône department and is a member of the Union for a Popular Movement Party.

References
Page on the Senate website

French Senators of the Fifth Republic
Union for a Popular Movement politicians
Living people
1947 births
Women members of the Senate (France)
21st-century French women politicians
Senators of Rhône (department)